Hands is the third studio album by recording artist Ron "Bumblefoot" Thal released in March 1998. This was his first release under the Bumblefoot name, and his first release under his own production company Hermit, Inc.

Track listing

Personnel
Ron Thal - guitars, basses, vocals
Jeff Thal - drums
Suzanne Bass - cello
Daniel Alvaro - saxophone
Orlando Oquendo - trombone

References 

1998 albums
Ron "Bumblefoot" Thal albums